Geckobia is a genus of parasitic mites in the family Pterygosomatidae.

Species 
Selected species include:

 Geckobia bataviensis
 Geckobia estherae
 Geckobia glebosum
 Geckobia nitidus
 Geckobia zapallarensis

References 

Animals described in 1878
Endemic fauna of Malta
Trombidiformes